Aleksandrówka may refer to the following places:
Aleksandrówka, Biała Podlaska County in Lublin Voivodeship (east Poland)
Aleksandrówka, Chełm County in Lublin Voivodeship (east Poland)
Aleksandrówka, Janów Lubelski County in Lublin Voivodeship (east Poland)
Aleksandrówka, Lubartów County in Lublin Voivodeship (east Poland)
Aleksandrówka, Gmina Krynki in Podlaskie Voivodeship (north-east Poland)
Aleksandrówka, Gmina Szudziałowo in Podlaskie Voivodeship (north-east Poland)
Aleksandrówka, Suwałki County in Podlaskie Voivodeship (north-east Poland)
Aleksandrówka, Gmina Dalików, Łódź Voivodeship (central Poland)
Aleksandrówka, Gmina Żychlin, Łódź Voivodeship (central Poland)
Aleksandrówka, Łuków County in Lublin Voivodeship (east Poland)
Aleksandrówka, Grójec County in Masovian Voivodeship (east-central Poland)
Aleksandrówka, Kozienice County in Masovian Voivodeship (east-central Poland)
Aleksandrówka, Mińsk County in Masovian Voivodeship (east-central Poland)
Aleksandrówka, Węgrów County in Masovian Voivodeship (east-central Poland)
Aleksandrówka, Zwoleń County in Masovian Voivodeship (east-central Poland)
Aleksandrówka, Greater Poland Voivodeship (west-central Poland)
Aleksandrówka, Silesian Voivodeship (south Poland)